Privilege Underwriters Reciprocal Exchange (PURE) is an American property insurance company established in 2006. It caters to high-net-worth customers. It offers insurance for homes with a rebuild value of more than one million dollars, automobiles, watercraft, jewelry, art and other collections, personal excess liability (umbrella), and flood. The company is based in White Plains, New York. PURE is a member of the PURE Group of Insurance Companies (the PURE Group).

See also
 PURE Insurance Championship

References

Financial services companies established in 2006
Companies based in White Plains, New York